Jaal ( Trap) is a Pakistani Urdu-language drama television series premiered on 1 March 2019 on Hum TV. It is co-produced by Momina Duraid and Moomal Shunaid under their banner MD Productions and Moomal Entertainment. It stars Imran Ashraf, Sumbul Iqbal, Ali Kazmi and Sukaina Khan in leading roles.

Plot
The story proceeds focusing on Esha (Sumbul Iqbal) as a successful working woman married to her co-worker Arsal (Ali Kazmi) who happens to be her subordinate and insecure of her escalating career relative to his dampening profile both in the office and the family. Esha's sister, Zonia (Sukaina Khan), turn the tables when she embarks on an illicit relationship with Arsal eventually ending up getting herself married to him leaving Esha at verge of a heart-wrenching divorce as both families hit a low and when all the blood relations turn cold, Esha's mother (Ismat Zaidi), makes a will to her before dying to marry Arsal's younger brother Zaid (Imran Ashraf) who secretly loves her.

Cast

Imran Ashraf as Zaid Arshad
Sumbul Iqbal as Esha Jameel
Ali Kazmi as Arsal Arshad
Sukaina Khan as Zonia
Ismat Zaidi as Sakina Jameel, Esha, Zonia and Asad's mother (dead)
Khalid Anam as Jameel Siddiqui (dead)
Anam Tanveer as Sherina, Asad's wife
Naveed Raza as Asad,  Esha and Zonia's elder brother
Shabbir Jan as Arshad Ahmed
Farah Nadeem as Tehmina Arshad, Arsal's mother, Zonia's mother-in law
Asma Omer Khan as Amber, Arsal and Zaid's sister

Reception
Jaal was one of the most popular dramas of Hum TV during its run. Each episode has more than or near 1 million views. The first episode had over 2.1 million views. The show also received high TRPs and became a slot leader, and received 7.3 TRPs at its highest followed by a TRPs of 7.2.

References

External links
Official website

2019 Pakistani television series debuts